The rainbow slender wrasse (Suezichthys arquatus), also known as the painted rainbow wrasse, is a species of marine ray-finned fish, a wrasse from the family Labridae. It is native to the western Pacific Ocean where it is found from Japan to Australia and east to New Zealand. This species can reach  in total length.

References

Rainbow slender wrasse
Fish described in 1985